Mustafa Agić (born 8 April 1966) is a retired Bosnian footballer.

Club career
Born in Brčko, SR Bosnia and Herzegovina, he started playing in local club FK Jedinstvo Brčko in Yugoslav Second League. He debuted in the season 1985–86 and in the winter-break of the 1987–88 season he was brought by Croatian giants NK Dinamo Zagreb. He played with Dinamo in the Yugoslav First League in the second half of the 1987–88 and in the 1988–89 seasons. He made a total of 30 official appearances for Dinamo (24 in the league, 3 in Yugoslav Cup and 3 in European competitions, having scored 3 goals, all of them in the league). In 1989–90 he was still a Dinamo player but he played no games as he was an army conscript that year. In summer 1990 he was brought by Serbian side FK Spartak Subotica and played with Spartak in the Yugoslav First League in seasons 1990–91 (22 app., 0 goals) and 1991–92 (5 app., 1 goal).

After playing with Spartak he moved abroad, first he played in Greece with Kavala and PAOK, and then he moved to Germany where he played with Schweinfurt, TuS Koblenz and later with FC Arzheim.

References

External links
 Mustafa Agic at zerozero.pt

1966 births
Living people
People from Brčko District
Association football forwards
Yugoslav footballers
Bosnia and Herzegovina footballers
FK Jedinstvo Brčko players
GNK Dinamo Zagreb players
FK Spartak Subotica players
PAOK FC players
Kavala F.C. players
1. FC Schweinfurt 05 players
TuS Koblenz players
Yugoslav First League players
Bayernliga players
Bosnia and Herzegovina expatriate footballers
Expatriate footballers in Greece
Bosnia and Herzegovina expatriate sportspeople in Greece
Expatriate footballers in Germany
Bosnia and Herzegovina expatriate sportspeople in Germany